ONE Fight Night 8: Superlek vs. Rodtang is an upcoming Combat sport event produced by ONE Championship that will take place on March 25, 2023, at the Singapore Indoor Stadium in Kallang, Singapore.

Background 
A ONE Heavyweight World Championship title unification bout between current champion Arjan Bhullar and interim champion Anatoly Malykhin (also current ONE Light Heavyweight World Champion) was expected to headline the event. The pairing was previously scheduled to headline at ONE 161, but Bhullar withdraw due to suffering an injury in training and it was announced that Bhullar had surgery on the arm two weeks ago. However, the bout was removed from the event due to a shift in broadcaster commitments and the bout will be rescheduled to a card later this year, which will be announced in the near future.

A ONE Flyweight Kickboxing World Championship bout between current champion Superlek Kiatmuu9 and current ONE Flyweight Muay Thai Champion, #1 ranking contender Rodtang Jitmuangnon was promoted to the new main event.

A ONE Women's Atomweight Muay Thai World Championship title unification bout between current champion Allycia Rodrigues and interim champion Janet Todd (also current ONE Women's Atomweight Kickboxing World Champion) is expected to take place at the event. The pairing was previously scheduled to meet at ONE on Prime Video 5, but Todd pulled out from the event due to tests positive for COVID-19.

A women's atomweight bout between Itsuki Hirata and former Rizin Women's Super Atomweight Champion Seo Hee Ham is expected to take place at the event. The pairing was previously scheduled to meet at ONE 163, but the bout was scrapped for Hirata failed weight and hydration.

Reigning flyweight submission grappling champion Mikey Musumeci's sister Tammi Musumeci was booked to make her promotional debut at the event, taking on Bianca Basilio in a strawweight bout.

Fight card

See also 

 2023 in ONE Championship
 List of ONE Championship events
 List of current ONE fighters

References 

Events in Singapore
ONE Championship events
2023 in mixed martial arts
Mixed martial arts in Singapore
Sports competitions in Singapore
March 2023 sports events in Asia
Scheduled mixed martial arts events